The Flower of Doom is a 1917 silent drama film written and directed by Rex Ingram and starring Wedgwood Nowell, Yvette Mitchell and Nicholas Dunaew. A reporter has to rescue a singer kidnapped in Chinatown.

Cast
 Wedgwood Nowell as Sam Savinsky
 Yvette Mitchell as Tea Rose
 Nicholas Dunaew as Paul Rasnov
 M. K. Wilson as Harvey Pearson 
 Gypsy Hart as Neeva Sacon
 Tommy Morrissey as Buck
 Frank Tokunaga as Charley Sing
Goro Kino as Ah Wong (as Gordo Keeno)
 Evelyn Selbie as Arn Fun

Preservation status
The film has been preserved from a 35mm nitrate print by George Eastman House and the UCLA Film and Television Archive.

References

External links

1917 crime drama films
1917 films
American crime drama films
American silent feature films
American black-and-white films
Films directed by Rex Ingram
Universal Pictures films
1910s American films
Silent American drama films